Abercegir is a small rural village in Powys, Wales.

It lies approximately 4 miles east of the town of Machynlleth and is 81 miles (131 km) from Cardiff and 172 miles (277 km) from London.

References

External links 

Photos of Abercegir and surrounding area on geograph

Villages in Powys
Glantwymyn